Grizedale Bridge is a Grade II listed bridge in the English parish of Over Wyresdale, Lancashire. The structure, which dates to the 19th century, carries Rakehouse Brow (part of the road between the Trough of Bowland and Lancaster) over the River Grizedale. A Grade II listed structure, it is in sandstone and consists of a single elliptical arch and has a solid parapet with a rounded top.

See also
Listed buildings in Over Wyresdale

References

Sources

Grade II listed buildings in Lancashire
Bridges in Lancashire
Stone bridges in England
Road bridges in England
Bridges completed in the 19th century
19th-century establishments in England